The women's 10,000 metres at the 2019 Asian Athletics Championships was held on 23 April.

Results

References

10000
10,000 metres at the Asian Athletics Championships
2019 in women's athletics